The 2021–22 Wake Forest Demon Deacons women's basketball team represented Wake Forest University during the 2021–22 NCAA Division I women's basketball season. The Demon Deacons were led by tenth year head coach Jen Hoover, competed as members of the Atlantic Coast Conference and played their home games at the Lawrence Joel Veterans Memorial Coliseum.

The Demon Deacons finished the season 16–17 overall and 4–14 in ACC play to finish in a tie for eleventh place. As the eleventh seed in the ACC tournament, they defeated fourteenth seed Virginia in the First Round before losing to sixth seed Georgia Tech in the Second Round. They received an at-large bid to the WNIT.

Previous season

The Demon Deacons finished the season 12–13 and 8–10 in ACC play to finish in a tie for ninth place.  As the ninth seed in the ACC tournament, they defeated North Carolina in the Second Round before losing to Louisville in the Quarterfinals.  They received an at-large bid to the NCAA tournament as the nine seed in the Alamo Region.  In the tournament, they lost in the First Round to eight seed Oklahoma State.

Off-season

Departures

Incoming Transfers

Recruiting Class

Source:

Roster

Schedule

Source:

|-
!colspan=6 style=| Non-Conference regular Season

|-
!colspan=6 style=| ACC regular Season

|-
!colspan=6 style=| ACC Women's Tournament

|-
!colspan=6 style=| WNIT

Rankings

Coaches did not release a Week 2 poll and AP does not release a final poll.

See also
 2021–22 Wake Forest Demon Deacons men's basketball team

References

Wake Forest Demon Deacons women's basketball seasons
Wake Forest
Wake Forest women's basketball
Wake Forest women's basketball
Wake Forest